The 18th annual Venice International Film Festival was held from 25 August to 8 September 1957.The Golden Lion was awarded to Aparajito by Satyajit Ray.

Jury
 René Clair (France) (head of jury)
 Vittorio Bonicelli (Italy)
 Ettore Giannini (Italy)
 Penelope Houston (UK)
 Arthur Knight (USA)
 Miguel Perez Ferrero (Spain)
 Ivan Pyryev (Soviet Union)

Films in competition

Awards
Golden Lion:
Aparajito (Satyajit Ray)
Silver Lion:
Le Notti Bianche (Luchino Visconti)
Volpi Cup:
 Best Actor - Anthony Franciosa - (A Hatful of Rain)
 Best Actress - Dzidra Ritenberga  - (Malva)
New Cinema Award
Best Film - Aparajito (Satyajit Ray)
 Best Actor - Anthony Franciosa - (A Hatful of Rain)
Best Actress - Eva Marie Saint - (A Hatful of Rain)
San Giorgio Prize
Something of Value (Richard Brooks)
FIPRESCI Prize
Aparajito (Satyajit Ray)
OCIC Award
A Hatful of Rain (Fred Zinnemann)
Pasinetti Award
A Hatful of Rain (Fred Zinnemann)

References

External links
 
 Venice Film Festival 1957 Awards on IMDb

Venice International Film Festival
Venice International Film Festival
Venice Film Festival
Film
Venice International Film Festival
Venice International Film Festival